Christopher Green is an Australian writer of speculative short fiction.

Biography
Green is a graduate of Clarion South and currently lives in Geelong, Australia. His first story was published in 2008, entitled "Lakeside" which was published in the anthology Dreaming Again, edited by Jack Dann. "Lakeside" was a finalist at the 2008 Australian Shadow Awards. In 2009 Green had three stories on the short-list at the Aurealis Award – "Having Faith" was a finalist in the horror short story division but lost to Paul Haines' "Slice of Life", a "A Hundredth Name" was a finalist in the science fiction short story division but lost to Peter M. Ball's "Clockwork, Patchwork and Ravens", and "Father's Kill" won the fantasy short story award.

Green was also a short-listed for the 2010 Ditmar Award for new talent. In 2011 Green started writing his first novel. Entitled Arizona Afterwards he published the novel online as a free one-chapter-a-week novel. Green also released his first collection, Love and Other Losses, which contained 14 short stories. It was published by Nighttime Logic as an Amazon Kindle e-book.

Bibliography

Collections

Novels

Short fiction

References
General
About (bibliography) at christophergreen.wordpress.com

Specific

External links

Australian fantasy writers
Australian science fiction writers
Living people
Year of birth missing (living people)
Australian male short story writers